Walter Brown Newman (11 February 1916 – 14 October 1993) was an American radio writer and screenwriter active from the late 1940s to the early 1990s. He was nominated three times for Academy Awards (Ace in the Hole, Cat Ballou, and Bloodbrothers), but he is best-known for a work that never made it to the screen: his unproduced original script Harrow Alley, which "has achieved legendary status in Hollywood."

Newman earned a bachelor's degree at New York University and studied law at Harvard University. After working as a publicist in New York and serving in the U.S. Army during World War II, he moved to Los Angeles and began writing radio dramas. Newman's radio writing included scripts for Escape, Suspense, and The Halls of Ivy as well as the first broadcast episode of Gunsmoke.

He is not officially credited for his screenplays for The Magnificent Seven and The Great Escape, having renounced credit after sharp disagreements with the director, John Sturges in both cases, over changes made during shooting.

Newman was born in New York City. He died in Sherman Oaks, California, a suburb of Los Angeles, on 14 October 1993.

Select Credits
The Bigelow Theatre - "Big Hello" (1951)
Ace in the Hole (1951)
Suspense' - "A Vision of Death" (1951)Gunsmoke (radio show) - pilotUnderwater! (1955)The Man with the Golden Arm (1955)The True Story of Jesse James (1956)Westinghouse Desilu Playhouse - "The Crazy Hunter" (1958)Crime & Punishment, USA (1959)The Magnificent Seven (1960) - uncreditedThe Interns (1962)The Beachcomber (1962) - creatorThe Great Escape (1963) - uncreditedThe Richard Boone Show - "The Hooligan" (1964)Cat Ballou (1965)Marooned (1969) - original draftBloodbrothers (1978)The Champ (1978)
Unproduced scriptsBaggy Pants (1966)Cabbages and Kings (1967)Trial (1970)Harrow Alley'' (1970)

External links

References

1916 births
1993 deaths
American male screenwriters
20th-century American male writers
20th-century American screenwriters
United States Army personnel of World War II
New York University alumni